The men's 4 x 100 metres relay event at the 2007 Asian Athletics Championships was held in Amman, Jordan on July 28–29.

Medalists

Results

Heats

Final

References

Heats results
Final results

2007 Asian Athletics Championships
Relays at the Asian Athletics Championships